Pablita Velarde (September 19, 1918 – January 12, 2006) born Tse Tsan (Tewa: "Golden Dawn") was an American Pueblo artist and painter.

Early life and education
Velarde was born on Santa Clara Pueblo near Española, New Mexico on September 19, 1918. After the death of her mother, when Velarde was about five years old, she and two of her sisters were sent to St Catherine's Indian School in Santa Fe. At the age of fourteen, she was accepted to Dorothy Dunn's Santa Fe Studio School at the Santa Fe Indian School and was one of the first women students. There, she became an accomplished painter in the Dunn style, known as "flatstyle" painting. Concerned about the rapid changes in native lifestyles, she described the School's flat painting narrative style as "memory paintings" which could help preserve older ways of life.  In her early classes she befriended artist Tonita Peña, who influenced her style.

Work
Velarde's early paintings were exclusively watercolors, but later in life she learned how to prepare paints from natural pigments using a process similar to, but not the same as fresco secco. She used these paints to produce what she called "earth paintings". She obtained pigments from minerals and rocks, which she ground on a metate and mano until the result was a powdery substance from which she made her paints.

In 1939, Velarde was commissioned by the National Park Service, under a grant from the Works Progress Administration (WPA), to depict scenes of traditional Pueblo life for visitors to the Bandelier National Monument. Following her work at Bandelier, Velarde went on to become one of the most accomplished Native American painters of her generation, with solo exhibitions throughout the United States, including in her native New Mexico, as well as in Florida and California. Her mural commissions were funded by the WPA.

In 1960, she published a book which features six Tewa tribal stories, "Old Father the Story Teller".

In a 1979 interview she said, "Painting was not considered women's work in my time. A woman was supposed to be just a woman, like a housewife and a mother and chief cook. Those were things I wasn't interested in."

Velarde's work is exhibited in public and private collections including the Bandelier National Monument museum, the Museum of Indian Arts and Culture, the Avery Collection at the Arizona State Museum, the Ruth and Charles Elkus Collection of Native American Art, and in the Smithsonian National Museum of Natural History.

Margarete Bagshaw founded in 2012 the Pablita Velarde Museum of Indian Women dedicated to her grandmother's legacy as well as other female Native American artists in Santa Fe, however it closed in 2015 when Margarete died.

Personal life
In 1942, Velarde married Herbert Hardin, a graduate of the University of California who she had known for some time. The couple had three children and lived in the Sandia Mountains outside of Albuquerque in New Mexico. Her daughter, Helen Hardin, and her granddaughter Margarete Bagshaw became prominent artists in their own right.

Awards and honors
In 1953, she was the first woman to receive the Grand Purchase Award at the Philbrook Museum of Art’s Annual Exhibition of Contemporary Indian Painting. In 1954 the French government honored Velarde and eleven other Native American artists and craftsman with the Palmes Académiques for excellence in art, this was the first foreign honors paid to Native American artists. The other artists awarded this honor included;  Harrison Begay, Allan Houser, Marie Martinez, Awa Tsireh, Velino Herrera, Joe H. Herrera, Severa Tafoya, Ambrose Koannorse, Andrew Tsihnahjinnie, Fred Kabotie, and James Kewannywtewa.

1953 - Grand Purchase Award, Annual Exhibition of Contemporary Indian Painting, Philbrook Museum of Art
1954 - Ordre des Palmes Académiques, Palmes Académiques
1977 - New Mexico Governor's Award
1988 - Santa Fe Living Treasure
1990 - Lifetime Achievement Award - national Women's Caucus for Art

See also 
 List of Native American artists
 Visual arts by indigenous peoples of the Americas

References

Bibliography

External links
Pablita Velarde artwork at Bandelier National Monument
Oral history interview with Pablita Velarde, 1965 September 29, Archives of American Art, Smithsonian Institution
Pablita Velarde Interview, Art Journal, Vol. 53, No. 1, Art and Old Age (Spring, 1994), Sally Hyer and Pablita Velarde, DOI: 10.2307/777538

Santa Clara Pueblo people
Native American painters
1918 births
2006 deaths
Pueblo artists
Painters from New Mexico
Works Progress Administration workers
American women painters
20th-century American painters
20th-century American women artists
Native American women artists
20th-century Native Americans
21st-century Native Americans
20th-century Native American women
21st-century Native American women